was the 10th Chief Justice of Japan (1982–1985). He is the father of Itsuro Terada, the current Chief Justice. He was a graduate of University of Tokyo. He was a recipient of the Order of the Rising Sun.

1915 births
2002 deaths
Chief justices of Japan
Grand Cordons of the Order of the Rising Sun
University of Tokyo alumni
People from Aichi Prefecture